The SIGCSE Lifetime Service to Computer Science Education is an awarded granted by the Association for Computing Machinery (ACM) Special Interest Group (SIG) SIGCSE annually since 1997, for lifetime fcontributions to computer science education.

Laureates
Laureates have included:
 Gloria Townsend, 2019
 Eric S. Roberts, 2018
 Mats Daniels, 2017
 Barbara Boucher Owens, 2016
 Frank Young, 2015
 Andrea Lawrence, 2014
 Henry Walker, 2013
 , 2012
 Gordon Davies, 2011
 Peter J. Denning, 2010
 Michael Clancy, 2009
 Dennis J. Frailey, 2008
 John Impagliazzo, 2007
 Joyce Currie Little, 2006
 Andrew McGettrick, 2005
 Bruce Klein, 2004
 , 2003
 A. Joe Turner, 2002
 , 2001
 James Miller, 2000
 Bob Aiken, 1999
 Della Bonnette, 1998
 Dick Austing, 1997

References

Academic awards
Computer science education